Slavina is a village south of Postojna on the way to Pivka in the Inner Carniola region of Slovenia.

The parish church in the settlement is dedicated to the Assumption of Mary and belongs to the Koper Diocese.

References

External links

Slavina on Geopedia

Populated places in the Municipality of Postojna